The Kaskaskia were an indigenous North American tribe of the Northeastern Woodlands.

Kaskaskia may also refer to:

Geography
Kaskaskia, Illinois, a village in Randolph County
Kaskaskia Precinct, Randolph County, Illinois
Kaskaskia Township, Fayette County, Illinois

Natural features
Kaskaskia River, a tributary of the Mississippi River
Kaskaskia sequence, a geological cratonic sequence

Parks
Fort Kaskaskia State Historic Site, commemorating the town of Old Kaskaskia, Illinois
Kaskaskia River State Fish and Wildlife Area, an Illinois state park

Trails
Kaskaskia Alliance Trail, an extension of the Grand Illinois Trail
Kaskaskia–Cahokia Trail, the first road in Illinois
Shawneetown–Kaskaskia Trail, Southern Illinois

Other
Hotel Kaskaskia, a historic building in LaSalle, Illinois
Illinois campaign, also called the Kaskaskia Expedition
Kaskaskia Baptist Association, a Southern Baptist ministry in Patoka, Illinois
Kaskaskia Bell State Memorial in Kaskaskia, Illinois
Kaskaskia College, a public community college in Centralia, Illinois
USS Kaskaskia (AO-27), a ship named for the Kaskaskia River

See also

Kaskas (disambiguation)